Advances in Microbial Physiology is an biannual peer-reviewed scientific journal covering microbiology. It was established in 1967 and is published by Academic Press. The founding editors-in-chief were Anthony H. Rose and John Frome Wilkinson; the current editor is Robert K. Poole (University of Sheffield). Each issue is also published as a book with a separate ISBN.

Abstracting and indexing 
The journal is abstracted and indexed by Index Medicus/MEDLINE/PubMed, Chemical Abstracts Service, Science Citation Index, BIOSIS Previews, and Scopus. According to the Journal Citation Reports, the journal has a 2013 impact factor of 5.800.

References

External links 
 

Microbiology journals
Publications established in 1967
Academic Press academic journals
Physiology journals
English-language journals
Biannual journals